Encrinurus is a long-lived genus of phacopid trilobites that lived in what are now Africa, Asia, Australia, Europe, North America, and South America from the middle Ordovician to the early Devonian from 472 to 412.3 mya, existing for approximately .

Taxonomy 
Encrinurus was named by Emmrich in 1844. Jell and Adrain (2003) list it as a currently valid genus name within the Phacopida, specifically within the Encrinuridae.

References

Further reading 
 Fossils (Smithsonian Handbooks) by David Ward  
 Trilobites by Riccardo Levi-Setti
 Invertebrate Palaeontology and Evolution by E.N.K. Clarkson  
 Trilobites: Common Trilobites of North America (A NatureGuide book) by Jasper Burns

Encrinuridae genera
Ordovician trilobites
Silurian trilobites
Devonian trilobites
Trilobites of Africa
Trilobites of Asia
Trilobites of Oceania
Trilobites of Europe
Trilobites of North America
Ordovician trilobites of South America
Middle Ordovician first appearances
Early Devonian genus extinctions
Paleozoic life of Ontario
Verulam Formation
Paleozoic life of British Columbia
Paleozoic life of Manitoba
Paleozoic life of the Northwest Territories
Paleozoic life of Nunavut
Paleozoic life of Quebec
Fossil taxa described in 1844